Professor Jane S. Green PhD, Hon FCCMG, FCAHS (born 1943) is a Canadian medical geneticist.

Life
Green studied Zoology, obtaining a BSc in 1964, and Drosophila Genetics, obtaining an MSc in 1966, both from the University of British Columbia. She moved to Newfoundland in 1967.

She helped to establish an Ocular Genetics Clinic from 1978 to 1986 and, after a family was referred there with Von Hippel–Lindau disease, began a cancer genetics screening programme.

She became a faculty member at Memorial University of Newfoundland in 1988 and obtained a PhD there in 1995; her dissertation was on the development of clinical and genetic screening programmes for hereditary cancer syndromes. She was appointed Professor in the Discipline of Genetics there in 2002,  and retired in April 2016.

In 2008 she received the Canadian Institutes of Health Research's Knowledge Translation award. She was elected an Honorary Fellow of the Canadian College of Medical Geneticists (Hon FCCMG) in the same year. She received the CCMG's Founders Award in 2012 for her contribution to developing genetics services in Newfoundland and Canada, and was awarded the Order of Newfoundland and Labrador in 2013. She is also a Fellow of the Canadian Academy of Health Sciences (FCAHS).

References

External links 
 
 

1943 births
Place of birth missing (living people)
Living people
Members of the Order of Newfoundland and Labrador
Officers of the Order of Canada
Canadian geneticists
People from Newfoundland (island)
Fellows of the Canadian Academy of Health Sciences
Honorary Fellows of the Canadian College of Medical Geneticists
University of British Columbia alumni
Academic staff of the Memorial University of Newfoundland
Memorial University of Newfoundland alumni
Canadian women geneticists
20th-century Canadian women scientists
21st-century Canadian women scientists